Zaborowo  is a settlement in the administrative district of Gmina Purda, within Olsztyn County, Warmian-Masurian Voivodeship, in northern Poland.

Before 1772 the area was part of Kingdom of Poland, 1772–1871 Prussia, 1871–1945 Germany, and again Poland since 1945. During the Nazi campaign of changing placenames to remove traces of Polish origin, it was renamed Heideberg. The historic name Zaborowo was restored in post-war Poland in 1945.

References

Zaborowo